In pharmacology, the volume of distribution (VD, also known as apparent volume of distribution, literally, volume of dilution) is the theoretical volume that would be necessary to contain the total amount of an administered drug at the same concentration that it is observed in the blood plasma. In other words, it is the ratio of amount of drug in a body (dose) to concentration of the drug that is measured in blood, plasma, and un-bound in interstitial fluid.

The VD of a drug represents the degree to which a drug is distributed in body tissue rather than the plasma. VD is directly proportional with the amount of drug distributed into tissue; a higher VD indicates a greater amount of tissue distribution. A VD greater than the total volume of body water (approximately 42 liters in humans) is possible, and would indicate that the drug is highly distributed into tissue. In other words, the volume of distribution is smaller in the drug staying in the plasma than that of a drug that is widely distributed in tissues.

In rough terms, drugs with a high lipid solubility (non-polar drugs), low rates of ionization, or low plasma protein binding capabilities have higher volumes of distribution than drugs which are more polar, more highly ionized or exhibit high plasma protein binding in the body's environment. Volume of distribution may be increased by kidney failure (due to fluid retention) and liver failure (due to altered body fluid and plasma protein binding). Conversely it may be decreased in dehydration.

The initial volume of distribution describes blood concentrations prior to attaining the apparent volume of distribution and uses the same formula.

Equations
The volume of distribution is given by the following equation:

Therefore, the dose required to give a certain plasma concentration can be determined if the VD for that drug is known. The VD is not a physiological value; it is more a reflection of how a drug will distribute throughout the body depending on several physicochemical properties, e.g. solubility, charge, size, etc.

The unit for Volume of Distribution is typically reported in  litres.  As body composition changes with age, VD decreases.

The VD may also be used to determine how readily a drug will displace into the body tissue compartments relative to the blood:

Where:

 VP = plasma volume
 VT = apparent tissue volume
 fu = fraction unbound in plasma
 fuT = fraction unbound in tissue

Examples

If you administer a dose D of a drug intravenously in one go (IV-bolus), you would naturally expect it to have an immediate blood concentration  which directly corresponds to the amount of blood contained in the body . Mathematically this would be:

But this is generally not what happens. Instead you observe that the drug has distributed out into some other volume (read organs/tissue). So probably the first question you want to ask is: how much of the drug is no longer in the blood stream?
The volume of distribution  quantifies just that by specifying how big a volume you would need in order to observe the blood concentration actually measured.

An example for a simple case (mono-compartmental) would be to administer D=8 mg/kg to a human. A human has a blood volume of around 0.08 L/kg 
.
This gives a 100 µg/mL if the drug stays in the blood stream only, and thus its volume of distribution is the same as  that is  0.08 L/kg. If the drug distributes into all body water the volume of distribution would increase to approximately 0.57 L/kg

If the drug readily diffuses into the body fat the volume of distribution may increase dramatically, an example is chloroquine which has a 250-302 L/kg

Sample values and equations

References

External links 
 Tutorial on volume of distribution
 Overview at icp.org.nz
 Overview at cornell.edu
 Overview at stanford.edu
 Overview at boomer.org

Pharmacokinetics